Albert Frederick Pollard, FBA (16 December 1869 – 3 August 1948) was a British historian who specialized in the Tudor period. He was one of the founders of the Historical Association in 1906.

Life and career 

Pollard was born in Ryde on the Isle of Wight and educated at Portsmouth Grammar School, Felsted School and Jesus College, Oxford where he achieved a first class honours in Modern History in 1891. He became Assistant Editor of and a contributor to the Dictionary of National Biography in 1893. His main academic post was that of Professor of Constitutional History at University College London which he held from 1903 to 1931. He was a member of the Royal Commission on Historical Manuscripts, and founder of the Historical Association, 1906. He edited History, 1916–1922, and the Bulletin of the Institute of Historical Research, 1923–1939. He published 500 articles in the Dictionary of National Biography, and many other books and papers concerning history. Later in his career, he was a major force in establishing history as an academic subject in Britain. The Evolution of Parliament, one of his most influential textbooks, was published in 1920.

Controversy 

Albert Pollard studied and wrote about the history of the Tudors from a political viewpoint. Key books include Henry VIII (1905) and The History of England from the Accession of Edward VI to the Death of Elizabeth, 1547–1603 (1910). In the latter he famously concluded that "Sterility was the conclusive note of Mary's reign"; this statement has been challenged by revisionist historians in recent years who have portrayed Mary in a much more favourable way. 
Some of Pollard's speculations are nowadays generally discredited by the revisionist school of history led by academics such as Christopher Haigh. For example, he put forward the thesis that English foreign policy from 1514 to 1529 was motivated by Thomas Wolsey's desire to become Pope. Pollard is identified with the Whiggish school of history, along with his student, J. E. Neale. They saw Henry VIII as a vigorous reformer who led England out of obscure medieval ways and into the modern world.

Politics 

Pollard was politically active for the Liberal Party and stood as Liberal candidate for the London University in the 1922, 1923 and 1924 General Elections.

Personal life 

In retirement Pollard lived at Milford-on-Sea in Hampshire. He was the father of the bibliographer and bookseller Graham Pollard and father-in-law to pioneering Communist and women's rights campaigner Kay Beauchamp.

Works

Contributions to the Dictionary of National Biography 

Pollard was a prolific contributor to the DNB. Among many others:

Contributions to the Oxford Dictionary of National Biography

References

External links 

Albert Pollard papers at Senate House Library, University of London
Correspondence between Albert Pollard and Josiah Clement Wedgwood

1869 births
1948 deaths
Academics of University College London
Alumni of Jesus College, Oxford
19th-century English historians
Liberal Party (UK) parliamentary candidates
People educated at The Portsmouth Grammar School
People from Ryde
20th-century English historians